Mental Releases is the debut album of Christian hip hop duo GRITS.

Critical reception

Awarding the album an eight out of ten from Cross Rhythms, Tony Cummings states, "A truly original band pushing back the hip hop boundaries." Patrick Anderson, rating the album two and a half stars at Jesus Freak Hideout, writes, "so don't expect it to be a solid modern rap album".

Track listing
 Cataclysmic Circles / World Is Round - 5:21
 Weigh a Buck 50 - 3:28
 Set Ya Mind At Ease - 4:26
 10-A-Cee - 4:10
 Universal and Worldwide / Don't Bring Me Down - 4:57
 Gettin' Ready - 4:13
 Screen Door - 4:08
 Jazz - 3:57
 Temptations - 4:35
 Kickin' Mo' Rhymes - 4:55
 Get the Picture / Grammatical Revolution - 4:34
 Forgive Me - 3:59
 Why Battle Me (featuring Liquid Man) - 4:49
 Everybody Wants On - 4:15
 The Outro - 2:08

References

1995 debut albums
GRITS albums
Gotee Records albums